Silanwali Tehsil , is a subdivision (tehsil) of Sargodha District in the Punjab province of Pakistan. The tehsil's headquarters is situated in the town of Silanwali.
It is administratively subdivided into 16 Union Councils.
Population is 255,000 (1998) being mainly Muslim and Punjabi speaking.

Administration
The tehsil of Silanwali is administratively subdivided into 16  Union Councils, these are:

References

Sargodha District
Tehsils of Punjab, Pakistan
Populated places in Sargodha District